Rubén Darío Velázquez Bermúdez (born December 18, 1975) is a retired Colombian footballer.

Club career
Velázquez was part of the Once Caldas squad that won the 2004 Copa Libertadores title, surely the most unlikely team ever crowned champions of South America.

In 2006 Velázquez left Colombia for the first time in his career to join Colón de Santa Fe.

External links
 Primera División Argentina statistics at Futbol XXI
 BDFA profile

1975 births
Living people
Colombian footballers
Association football midfielders
Atlético Nacional footballers
Once Caldas footballers
Cortuluá footballers
Real Cartagena footballers
Club Atlético Colón footballers
Deportivo Cali footballers
Expatriate footballers in Argentina
2003 FIFA Confederations Cup players
2003 CONCACAF Gold Cup players
Colombia international footballers
People from Risaralda Department